Hoplarchus is a genus of cichlid in the tribe Heroini. It contains the single species Hoplarchus psittacus, which is endemic to the blackwater rivers in Brazil, Colombia and Venezuela, including the Rio Negro, Jamari, Preto da Eva, Urubu rivers and upper Orinoco drainages.  This fish can reach a length of  TL and is important as a food fish to local indigenous peoples. This species is occasionally kept as an aquarium fish and is traded under the common name "parrot cichlid" (a name also used for one other species and a hybrid fish).

References 

Heroini
Fish of South America
Monotypic freshwater fish genera
Cichlid genera
Taxa named by Johann Jakob Kaup